Przeciszów  is a village in Oświęcim County, Lesser Poland Voivodeship, in southern Poland. It is the seat of the gmina (administrative district) called Gmina Przeciszów.

The village has a population of 3,996.

External links
 Jewish Community in Przeciszów on Virtual Shtetl

References

Villages in Oświęcim County